A pōwhiri (called a pōhiri in eastern dialects, and pronounced  in the Taranaki-Whanganui area) is a Māori welcoming ceremony involving speeches, cultural performance, singing and finally the hongi. It is used to both welcome guests onto a marae or during other ceremonies, such as during a dedication of a building (where the owners or future users of the building might be welcomed). A pōwhiri may not be performed for every group of manuhiri (visitors); a mihi whakatau ("informal greeting to visitors") may be used instead. A pōwhiri is often used for special visitors or for tūpāpaku (the body of the deceased) for a tangihanga (funeral). However, a pōwhiri are also often performed for tourist groups as part of special events.

For most non-Māori speakers the wero, an aggressive challenge of the visitor at the beginning of the ceremony, is the most spectacular part of pōwhiri. During this part of the ceremony, three Māori warriors will advance cautiously towards the guests with ceremonial weapons and perform threatening gestures and grimaces, calling out battle screams and generally giving an impression of being ready to explode into violence against the visitors at any moment. The first warrior represents the realm of Tūmatauenga, the Atua (God) of War. The third Warrior represents Rongo the Atua of Peace (Rangimarie).  It is the final warrior who offers the rautapu, a signal that the manuhiri (guests) may enter the Marae-atea. Historically, it has roots in both showing off the martial prowess of the iwi's warriors, as well as testing the steadfastness of the visitors. By accepting the rautapu, a leaf or carved effigy, that the lead warrior will place on the ground before the visitors as a symbolic offering of peace, this part of the ceremony is concluded. 
On some occasions the pōwhiri begins before the karanga (the call), at other times it begins after the karanga has started

At some point, the karanga and the pōwhiri will be taking place at the same time. For the pōwhiri, the kaikaranga (female caller) usually stands to the side and slightly to the front of the remainder of the tangata whenua (hosts). Those who take part in the pōwhiri include elders and young people (men/women). After the manuhiri (guests) and tangata whenua are seated, both sides will have speakers usually beginning with the tangata whenua, and final speaker from the manuhiri will often present koha to the tangata whenua. It is usually placed on the ground by the final speaker from the manuhiri. Once the speaker is seated, someone from the tangata whenua will pick it up.

The ceremonial tapu is lifted when tangata whenua and manuhiri make physical contact with hongi or shaking hands.

References 

Māori culture
Māori words and phrases
Ceremonies